Antlers is an unincorporated community in Garfield County, in the U.S. state of Colorado.

History
A post office called Antlers was in operation from 1891 until 1954. The community derives its name from the Antlers Hotel (Colorado).

References

Unincorporated communities in Garfield County, Colorado
Unincorporated communities in Colorado
Populated places established in 1891
1891 establishments in Colorado